is an athletics stadium in  Kawagoe, Saitama, Japan. It is located within the Kawagoe Sports Park, which also includes a general gymnasium, and tennis courts.

External links

1992 establishments in Japan
Sports venues completed in 1992
Football venues in Japan
Sports venues in Saitama Prefecture
Athletics (track and field) venues in Japan
Buildings and structures in Kawagoe, Saitama
Multi-purpose stadiums in Japan